Saint-Jeures is a commune in the Haute-Loire department in south-central France. It is around 40 km southwest of Saint-Étienne.

Geography
The river Lignon du Velay flows through the commune.

Population

Personalities
 Joseph Bonet de Treyches, politician during the French Revolution, was born here on 28 March 1757.
 Philippe Vocanson, the oldest man in France (for 16 months) and in Europe (for 4 months), was born here on 20 October 1904. He died in Saint-Étienne on 18 January 2015 aged 110.

See also
Communes of the Haute-Loire department

References

Saintjeures